Malhun Hatun is a fictional character in the Turkish TV series, Kuruluş: Osman, portrayed by Yıldız Çağrı Atiksoy. She is based on Malhun Hatun. She is shown as the second wife of Osman Bey.

Background

Malhun's mother died when she was a young girl. She was raised by her father Ömer Bey and saw her brothers fall as martyrs one after the other as she grew up. She showed her father that she was nothing less than a son and does everything she can possibly do for him.

Storyline

Season 2

After saving Osman Bey from Aya Nikola, Malhun arrives in the Kayı tribe. Malhun tells Osman that she is trying to find a place for her tribe to reside which results in Osman giving her some land in Bithynia. Malhun decides to help Osman find the traitors in the Kayı but, not trusting Osman Bey, she doesn't tell Osman when she finds Dündar's ring at the same place where the traitor İdris was killed by the more powerful traitor who wanted to cover up his tracks. She is wounded by Togay and later captured by Nikola, although later freed. She is eventually subjected to Osman and Bala's anger for hiding the ring after her father gives it to Osman. She later regrets hiding the ring and seemingly develops feelings for Osman Bey, troubling her father. Osman then initiates a major battle with the Byzantines, with the support of Malhun Hatun which is historically known as the Battle of Domanic   She later marries Osman in a political marriage, and becomes pregnant soon after - giving birth to Osman's eldest son, Orhan.

Season 3
Malhun, who learns that Bala Hatun is pregnant, engages in a power struggle with Bala Hatun and the conflict between the two hatuns also seemingly affects the people of the tribe. But Selcan Hatun puts an end to any further conflicts by advising all the hatuns of the tribe to work amicably but reminds them that, there can only be one head hatun, which is Bala Hatun. Their relationship takes a turn for the better, when Malhun Hatun decides to entrust Orhan to Bala Hatun, while she accompanies Osman Bey and his alps on his conquest.

When the Kayi tribe is targeted by the Seljuk Vizier, Alamshah, Osman is framed for an assassination attempt on Sultan Mesud. Due to this, Gunduz Bey, Osman's brother, becomes the acting Bey of the tribe. He falls under Alamshah's influence and exiles Malhun, Bala and Selcan Hatun from the tribe - separating Malhun from Orhan. She later sneaks into the tribe with Aygul Hatun and takes him back. Osman eventually clears his name and they are all able to return to the tribe. However, tragedy strikes for Malhun as her father, Omer Bey, along with his loyal soldiers are secretly killed in a massacre by Barkin Bey, a traitorous bey who is engaged to Malhun's cousin, Selvi Hatun. She buries her father and vows to find his killers. 

Several years have passed and Osman's strength and power has heightened with time. Orhan and Alaeddin Ali are kidnapped to lure Osman into a trap but Malhun works with Osman and Bala to rescue them from Bilicek Castle - which is later conquered. However, the same day Osman returns from Bilicek, victorious, is the same day Osman's adoptive mother, Selcan Hatun, dies - leaving everyone devastated. While the preparations for the Inegol conquest are underway, Osman's daughter Fatma who was sent to the highlands, returns to the tribe to the joy of her close ones.

Casting

At first, when the series was named Diriliş: Osman, Aslıhan Karalar, the actress who played Burçin Hatun, was thought to play the role of Malhun Hatun, who didn't even appear in the first season. In the series, Osman's first partner is Rabia Bala Hatun and she was played by the Turkish actress Özge Törer, this was only believed after the series' first episode was released. Before the release of season 2, Özge Yağız and Yağmur Öztürk were believed to play the role of Malhun Hatun due to the fact that they both shared videos of them taking fencing lessons. This thought was dropped after Özge Yağız took part in the TV series  and Yağmur Öztürk took part in the TV series . Yağmur Öztürk was still, however, rumoured to play the role at some point. The 43rd episode trailer then revealed that  was likely to play this role, however, it turned out that she would play the role of "Aksu Hatun". It was later confirmed that Yıldız Çağrı Atiksoy would be playing the role.

See also
List of Diriliş: Ertuğrul characters
List of Kuruluş: Osman characters

Notes

References 

Diriliş: Ertuğrul and Kuruluş: Osman characters
Female characters in television
Fictional characters based on real people
Fictional fugitives
Fictional lords and ladies
Fictional politicians
Fictional female swordfighters
Fictional tribal chiefs
Fictional Turkic people
Fictional Turkish people 
Television characters introduced in 2021
Fictional Muslims